The Ypsilanti Food Co-op is a food cooperative located in Ypsilanti, Michigan. Located in historic Depot Town, it is Michigan's only solar-powered grocery store. Also owned by the co-op is the River Street Bakery, which features the only wood-fired brick oven in commercial use in Washtenaw County. The Ypsilanti Food Co-op, in turn, is owned by its membership and governed by its board of directors. The shared building also is home to two beehives that are part of the Local Honey Project, managed by members, and they live in the adjacent called "Honeybee Alley".

The co-op is a member of the National Cooperative Grocers Association. It is Ypsilanti's primary host of events concerning sustainability, ecology, and food-related issues; in addition, it is a sponsor of and promotes external activities such as Ypsilanti's farmers' markets and other local-food initiatives. The co-op provides card-reader services for both Ypsilanti farmers' markets, allowing all vendors to accept payment by credit card, as well as EBT/Snap cards.

History
The Ypsilanti Food Co-op was founded in 1975 on Sheridan St between Elm and Oakwood and is now located at 312 N. River Street in Ypsilanti's Depot Town neighborhood. The Mill Works Building, in which the co-op resides, was originally a foundry that made wheels for grinding flour.
 The food coop became Michigan's only solar-powered grocery store when a volunteer  group, called Solar Ypsi, installed solar panels in 2005.

Structure and governance

Food cooperative
As a cooperative, the Ypsilanti Food Co-op follows the 7 Cooperative Principles and offers natural foods, with an emphasis on organic and locally-grown and -made produce and groceries. Unlike a common corporation, decisions about how to run the Ypsilanti Food Co-op are not made by outside shareholders, and it is therefore able to manifest a higher degree of social responsibility than its corporate analogues. Much of the revenue made by the Co-op is returned to its local economy.

Ownership
The co-op is owned by its members, of which there are approximately 1000; it is directed by its general manager, who is in turn overseen by the co-op's board of directors. Co-op members receive a discount on retail items purchased in the store; an additional discount may be earned by members who choose to volunteer labor in or on behalf of the store.

Board of directors
The board of directors has seven members, elected to two-year terms by co-op members. The Ypsilanti Food Co-op's board meets at least monthly, and is charged with the oversight of co-op policy, governance, and overall vision.

Staff
A paid staff of approximately forty is employed by the co-op, with assistance from numerous member-volunteers.

See also
 List of food cooperatives

References

External links
 Ypsilanti Food Co-op website
 National Cooperative Grocers Association website
 Solar Ypsi project

1975 establishments in Michigan
Organic farming organizations
Food cooperatives in the United States
Food and drink companies established in 1975
Ypsilanti, Michigan